The British Swimming Championships (50 m) 2008 were held at the Ponds Forge International Sports Centre, Sheffield from 31 March to 6 April 2008. They also doubled as the trials for the Beijing Olympic Games.

To qualify for the Olympic team, swimmers had to achieve the FINA A standards in the heats, and finish in the first 2 in the respective final. Three swimmers (Liam Tancock, 100 m backstroke, David Davies 1500 m free, and Kirsty Balfour, 200 m breaststroke) pre-qualified due to their performances in the 2007 World Championships.

Medal winners

Men's events

Women's events

See also
British Swimming
List of British Swimming Championships champions
2008 in swimming

References

British Swimming Championships
Swimming Championships
2008